The Jamaica national cricket team  or officially the Jamaica Scorpions, is the representative first-class cricket team representing Jamaica at the West Indies domestic competitions.

History
The team's history dates back to 1895, when they played three matches against a touring side from England led by Slade Lucas, but because of the distance to the other cricketing countries, Jamaica did not play regular first-class cricket until 1964. They played in the inaugural Shell Shield first-class competition, winning it on the fourth attempt, but then had to wait until 1977–78 for their next title – which was a shared one-day title with Leeward Islands.

From 1986 to 1992, Jamaica won a total of six titles (three first class and three one-day), but in the thirteen seasons since then they have added four to the cupboard, despite completing the double in 1999–2000. In 2004–05, they came back after a two-year drought, however – with seven wins in ten regular season matches, they were 47 points ahead of runners-up Leeward Islands on the regular season table to win the Carib Beer Cup, before defeating the Leeward Islands by eight wickets in the final to take the Carib Beer Challenge title as well. However, this was followed up by a last-place finish the following season.

The team does not take part in any international competitions (the 1998 Commonwealth Games tournament being an exception), but rather in inter-regional competitions in the Caribbean, such as the Regional Four Day Competition and the Regional Super50, and the best players may be selected for the West Indies cricket team, which plays international cricket. Jamaica has won the domestic first class competition eight times, and they have also won the one-day competition six times – and shared the title once. The team competes in the Professional Cricket Leagues under the franchise name Jamaica Scorpions.

Prominent cricketers who have represented Jamaica include Jimmy Adams, Gerry Alexander, Jeff Dujon, Chris Gayle, George Headley, Michael Holding, Lawrence Rowe, Alfred Valentine, Courtney Walsh, Frank Worrell, Marlon Samuels, and Andre Russell.

Squad

Grounds 
Jamaica's main ground is Sabina Park in Kingston, which has hosted 144 first-class games since 1895. Usually at least two or three games have been played there each year, although they played no games in 2005, opting instead to have Alpart Sports Club Ground in Nain as their main home ground with three of five games. That ground will also host one game in the 2005–06 Carib Beer Cup, along with Kensington Park in Kingston and Chedwin Park in Spanish Town.

Honours 
 Regional Four Day Competition (11): 1968–69, 1987–88, 1988–89, 1991–92, 1999–2000, 2001–02, 2004–05, 2007–08, 2008–09, 2009–10, 2010–11, 2011–12
 Domestic one-day competition (8): 1977–78 (shared), 1983–84, 1985–86, 1986–87, 1990–91, 1999–2000, 2007–08, 2011-12

See also 
 List of international cricketers from Jamaica
 List of Jamaican representative cricketers
 Jamaican women's cricket team
 Jamaican Sportsperson of the Year

References

External links 
 Cricinfo
 CricketArchive
 First-class matches played on Sabina Park, Kingston, Jamaica

Cricket in Jamaica
Jamaica in international cricket
West Indian first-class cricket teams
National cricket teams
C